Catocala dissimilis is a moth of the family Erebidae. It is found in Russia (Primorye, Shabarovsk, Southern Amur), China, Korea and Japan (Hokkaido, Honshu, Shikoku, Kyushu).

The wingspan is about 45 mm.

Subspecies
Catocala dissimilis dissimilis
Catocala dissimilis melli Ishizuka, 2001

References

External links
Catocala of Asia

dissimilis
Moths of Asia
Moths described in 1861